Susanne in the Bath (German: Susanne im Bade) is a 1936 German comedy film directed by Jürgen von Alten and starring Manja Behrens, Max Gülstorff and Erich Fiedler. The title is an allusion to the biblical story of Susanna.

The film's sets were designed by the art director Gustav A. Knauer.

Cast

References

Bibliography 
 Waldman, Harry. Nazi Films in America, 1933–1942. McFarland, 2008.

External links 
 

1936 films
Films of Nazi Germany
German comedy films
1936 comedy films
1930s German-language films
Films directed by Jürgen von Alten
Films about fictional painters
Tobis Film films
German black-and-white films
1930s German films